The Pentwater River is a  river in Oceana County, Michigan, in the United States. It rises east of Hart at the inflow of the South Branch Pentwater River and flows northwest to Lake Michigan at the village of Pentwater.

See also
List of rivers of Michigan

References

Michigan  Streamflow Data from the USGS

Rivers of Michigan
Rivers of Oceana County, Michigan
Tributaries of Lake Michigan